Clifford Hicks is the name of:

Clifford B. Hicks (1920–2010), American writer
Cliff Hicks (born 1964), former NFL player